Antonio Hernández Mancha (born 1 April 1951 in Guareña, Badajoz) is a former Spanish politician and president of the People's Alliance political party from 1987 to 1989. He is married and has two children.

Political career
Hernández Mancha was elected regional president of People's Alliance in Andalucía (1980–87). In 1986, Manuel Fraga was removed for having attained his "electoral ceiling." The party conducted internal elections in which Hernández Mancha defeated Miguel Herrero y Rodríguez Miñón.

Hernández Mancha presented a motion of no confidence against Felipe González in order to be known by the population, but the motion was rejected as the Socialists held an absolute majority and his candidacy was therefore defeated. In 1989, he resigned from the post.

After leaving politics, Hernández Mancha worked as a lawyer and businessman.

Other activities
 Enagás, Independent Member of the Board of Directors (2014–2022)

References

External links 
 Article published by Hernández Mancha in El País
 La vacuna Hernández Mancha (article published in El País)
 El PP ya tiene muertos en el armario: el ‘fantasma’ de Antonio Hernández Mancha (article published in El Confidencial)

1951 births
Living people
People's Alliance (Spain) politicians
Members of the Senate of Spain
People from Las Vegas Altas
People named in the Panama Papers
Members of the 1st Parliament of Andalusia
Members of the 2nd Parliament of Andalusia